Guamúchil is a city located in the state of Sinaloa in Northwestern Mexico. It is located 100 km north of Culiacán, the capital of Sinaloa. The city serves as the seat of the municipality of Salvador Alvarado and is the economic  and sociocultural center of the Évora Valley Region, named after the local Évora river. In 2010, the city had a population of around 72,500 inhabitants. It is the fifth-largest city in the state in population after Culiacán, Mazatlán, Los Mochis and Guasave, respectively.

Municipal logo
The municipal logo consists of:

 Left top: the Mochomo mountain and the Evora River referring to its region
 Left bottom: the primary elements used in commerce relating to politics, social and cultural life
 Right top: the pacific railroad track that initiated the communication for progress in that area
 Right bottom: the chickpea as the main product in the region along with cheese and wool.
 Center: a man with open arms towards progress.
Overall Guamúchil has been one of the cities that generates the greatest progress to the state.

Climate 

Agriculture

Trade is a very important part for the economy of this city. There are large grain storage warehouses for sale and use. Agriculture is one of the main sources of income in the area, and different types of foods are grown but it is mainly corn and tomato.

This city can produce more than 15 types of different crops. Many basic for Regional Agro-industry and for domestic and international markets, such as safflower, wheat, soybeans, corn, sorghum, vegetables, chickpeas, fruits and grasses among others.

Notable people
Guamúchil is the birthplace of boxer Carlos Cuadras, singer Ana Gabriel, artist Ariel Camacho and Miss México World 2009 Perla Beltrán.

References

External links
Municipio de Salvador Alvarado Official website of Municipality of Salvador Alvarado
Page Of The City  Unofficial website of Municipality of Salvador Alvarado

Populated places in Sinaloa